Eleven ships of the Royal Navy have borne the name HMS Superb, or HMS Superbe:

  was 60-gun fourth rate launched in 1736 and broken up in 1757
  was a 74-gun third rate launched in 1760 and wrecked in 1783
  was a 22-gun sixth rate. She was sold in 1798.
  was a 74-gun third rate, launched in 1798 and broken up in 1826
  was an 80-gun second rate, launched in 1842 and broken up in 1869
 HMS Superb was to have been a broadside ironclad battleship, but she was renamed  in 1874 before being launched in 1875.  She was sold in 1908.
  was a battleship launched in 1875. She was built for the Turkish Navy, and was to have been named Hamidiyeh. She was purchased by Britain in 1873 and was sold in 1906.
  was  launched in 1907, involved in the Occupation of Constantinople and sold in 1923
  was a  light cruiser launched in 1943 and sold in 1960.
  is a  nuclear-powered hunter killer submarine launched in 1974, and decommissioned on 26 September 2008 after sustaining damage in an underwater grounding in the Red Sea

Battle honours
Ships named Superb have earned the following battle honours:
Passero, 1718
Sadras, 1782
Providien, 1782
Negapatam, 1782
Trincomalee, 1782
Gut of Gibraltar, 1801
San Domingo, 1806
Algiers, 1816
Alexandria, 1882
Jutland, 1916

See also 
 French ship Superbe

Royal Navy ship names